Jonas Erik Andersson (born 24 February 1981) is a Swedish former professional ice hockey player. Most of his career was spent playing in the SM-liiga, the top league in Finland, though he also briefly played for the Nashville Predators and Vancouver Canucks of the National Hockey League (NHL). Andersson played internationally for Sweden at both the junior and senior level, including the 2010 World Championship.

Playing career
Andersson was selected 33rd overall in the second round of the 1999 NHL Entry Draft by the Nashville Predators after playing two years in the Swedish J20 SuperElit with AIK.

Andersson immediately started his North American career the next season playing junior in the Ontario Hockey League with the North Bay Centennials scoring an impressive point per game to be named OHL All-Star Game and earning selection to the OHL First All-Rookie Team. He played the majority of his North American professional career with the Predators' minor league affiliate the Milwaukee Admirals, but played five games for Nashville in the 2001–02 NHL season.

Andersson failed to live up to his draft status since being picked, being part of the poor 1–2 punch that the Preds selected in 1999, following goaltender Brian Finley. He went back to Sweden in 2004, playing for Södertälje SK and Brynäs IF in Elitserien during the NHL lockout.

He then moved to the Finnish SM-liiga, playing for Ilves in 2005 and HPK in 2006 and 2007. He was traded to Kärpät mid-season and subsequently won the SM-liiga Championship. During the final series against Espoo, Andersson was the leading scorer with three goals and three assists in five games. In his first full season with Kärpät in 2008–09, Jonas broke out offensively to lead the team with 24 goals to finish second overall in the league.

On 16 April 2009, Andersson left the SM-liiga after four seasons and signed a one-year contract with HC Dinamo Minsk of the Kontinental Hockey League. In just 30 games with Dinamo he, posted 20 points on a checking line, earning a selection to make his senior international debut at the 2010 IIHF World Championship. Impressive two-way play made Jonas a standout on the Swedish team with a team leading 6 goals to help capture the Bronze medal.

On 1 July 2010, Andersson signed as a free agent on a one-year contract to return to the Nashville Predators of the NHL after seven seasons, however prior to his return with the Predators he was traded to the Vancouver Canucks along with Ryan Parent in exchange for Shane O'Brien and Dan Gendur.

Andersson was recalled to the NHL to play for the Canucks in a home game against the Anaheim Ducks on 8 December 2010. It was his first game in the NHL since the 2001–02 NHL season when he skated in five games for the Predators.

Career statistics

Regular season and playoffs

International

References

External links
 
Andersson retires

1981 births
Living people
Ak Bars Kazan players
Brynäs IF players
Atlant Moscow Oblast players
HC Dinamo Minsk players
HC Yugra players
HPK players
Ilves players
EHC Kloten players
Leksands IF players
Manitoba Moose players
Milwaukee Admirals players
Milwaukee Admirals (IHL) players
Nashville Predators draft picks
Nashville Predators players
North Bay Centennials players
Oulun Kärpät players
People from Lidingö Municipality
Södertälje SK players
Swedish expatriate ice hockey players in the United States
Swedish expatriate sportspeople in Belarus
Swedish expatriate ice hockey players in Finland
Swedish expatriate sportspeople in Switzerland
Swedish ice hockey left wingers
Torpedo Nizhny Novgorod players
Vancouver Canucks players
Sportspeople from Stockholm County
Swedish expatriate sportspeople in Russia
Expatriate ice hockey players in Russia
Swedish expatriate ice hockey players in Canada
Expatriate ice hockey players in Switzerland
Expatriate ice hockey players in Belarus